A bodle or boddle or bodwell, also known as a half groat or Turner was a Scottish copper coin, of less value than a bawbee, worth about one-sixth of an English penny. They were first issued under Charles I, and were minted until the coronation of Anne. Its name may derive from Bothwell (a mint-master).

It is mentioned in one of the songs of Joanna Baillie:

Black Madge, she is prudent, has sense in her noddle
Is douce and respectit; I carena a bodle.

The use of the word survives in the anglicised phrase "not to care a bodle", which Brewer glosses as "not to care a farthing". Something similar appears in Burns' Tam o' Shanter (line 110), it is also mentioned:

Fair play, he car'd na deils a boddle (He cared not devils a bodle)

Gallery

See also

Plack
Pound Scots
Scottish coinage
In Sunderland, County Durham, in the North of England there is a well known as the Bodelwell.

References

 MacKay, Charles – A Dictionary of Lowland Scotch (1888)
 Brewer's Dictionary of Phrase and Fable

External links
Elks, Ken. Coinage of Great Britain

Coins of Scotland